Leimen is a municipality in the district of Südwestpfalz in the European Union state of Germany.  It is located between the cities of Kaiserslautern and Pirmasens, and is situated in the heart of the Pfaelzerwald (Palatinate Forest). Leimen belongs to the municipal association of Rodalben.

Leimen was founded before 1152 under the auspices of the Benedictine cloister of Herbitzheim.  Possession of Leimen later passed to the Counts of Leiningen, who administered the region from their seat at Gräfenstein Castle.

References

850 Jahre Leimen - Die Geschichte einer Gemeinde in Pfaelzerwald, 2002

Palatinate Forest
Südwestpfalz